Periodic elections for the Tasmanian Legislative Council were held on 7 May 2022. Two seats were up for a regularly scheduled vote; Elwick and McIntyre. Simultaneously a by-election was held in the seat of Huon, following the resignation of the incumbent member Bastian Seidel.

Elwick
Josh Willie of the Labor Party was the incumbent candidate and was re-elected.

McIntyre
Independent Tania Rattray was the incumbent candidate and was re-elected.

Huon by-election
The by-election was triggered by the resignation of Bastian Seidel of the Labor Party, which took effect on 3 December 2021. The seat was won by Independent candidate Dean Harriss.

References

Tasmanian Legislative Council
Tasmanian
Tasmania state by-elections